The Reflector may refer to:

The Daily Reflector, a daily newspaper in Greenville, North Carolina
The Reflector (Indiana newspaper), the student newspaper at the University of Indianapolis
The Reflector (Mississippi newspaper), the student newspaper at Mississippi State University
The Reflector (Virginia newspaper), a defunct newspaper in Virginia
The Reflector (Washington newspaper), a weekly newspaper in Battle Ground, Washington

See also
 The Daily Reflector, an eastern North Carolina-based newspaper
 Reflector (disambiguation)